The Seychelles Women's League is the top flight of women's association football in Seychelles. The competition is run by the Seychelles Football Federation.

History
The first Seychelles women's championship was contested on 2000. The last winner is Mont Fleuri Rovers on 2020.

Champions
The list of champions and runners-up:

Most successful clubs

References

External links 
 Women’s football - seyfoot.com

Seychelles Women's League
Women's association football leagues in Africa
Football competitions in Seychelles
Women
Sports leagues established in 2000
Women's football in Seychelles